Whalton Manor is a house in the village of Whalton, Northumberland, England. It is a grade II listed building. The house dates from the 17th century but was substantially altered by the architect Sir Edwin Lutyens in 1908, at the same time as he was working on Lindisfarne Castle on Holy Island.

With the help of Gertrude Jekyll, Lutyens also designed the walled gardens, which include architectural features such as a pavilion, a tiled hexagonal summerhouse, a stone pergola and a stone paved courtyard.

References

External links
Whalton Manor Gardens

Gardens in Northumberland
Country houses in Northumberland
Grade II listed buildings in Northumberland
Grade II listed houses
Works of Edwin Lutyens in England
Manor